The following is a discography for Alive Naturalsound Records, an American independent music label founded in 1994. The label regularly releases albums both digitally, on vinyl, and on CD. The label is also known for releasing the debut albums by bands such as Lee Bains III and the Glory Fires, The Black Keys, Two Gallants, Radio Moscow, Black Diamond Heavies, Buffalo Killers, and Hollis Brown (band). The label has also released a number of reissues of musicians such as The Nerves, Swamp Dogg, Iggy Pop & James Williamson (musician), and Nathaniel Mayer as well as several compilation albums.

Artists

Discography

References

External links
Alive Naturalsound Records

Discographies of American record labels